Zemzemeh is a Persian TV channel, operated by Broadcast Middle East in Dubai, which is a joint venture between MOBY Group and 21st Century Fox.

Following the success of its sister channel FARSI1, Zemzemeh brings international comedies, dramas and romance to the screens of 100 million Persian speakers in the Middle East, Western Asia and Europe.

The channel has stopped (temporarily) since December 2012.

Programs

Resources
Persian Wikipedia

Television stations in the United Arab Emirates
Mass media in the United Arab Emirates
Movie channels
Persian-language television stations
Television channels and stations established in 2011
Mass media in Dubai